Stelis chlorina is a species of orchid plant native to Ecuador.

References 

chlorina
Flora of Ecuador